The 31 Tannery Projectis an office and shop building in Branchburg, New Jersey, United States. It serves as the corporate headquarters for Ferreira Construction, the Ferreira Group, and Noveda Technologies. The  building was constructed in 2006 and is the first building in the state of New Jersey to meet New Jersey's Executive Order 54. The building is also the first Net Zero Electric Commercial Building in the United States.

Building Details

Renewable Energy System 
DC solar photovoltaic system of 1,276 solar panels.
Two 100 kW AC 277/480 V three phase solar inverters.

HVAC System 
Nine miles of radiant heat (80 zones).
96% efficient condensing boiler plant.
High performance rooftop units.
Solar domestic hot water.

Voice/Data System 
Integrated Web based direct digital controls system and pervasive voice/data/video system with kiosk displays.

Backup Energy System 
 Transfer switch for a future 200 kW gas-fired emergency generator.

Building energy monitoring

SunFlow Monitor 
SunFlow Monitor graphically depicts the buildings renewable energy production in real-time.

EnergyFlow Monitor 
EnergyFlow Monitor graphically depicts the buildings energy consumption in real-time.

Facilimetrix 
Facilimetrix graphically depicts the buildings room temperature readings and hot water temperature readings in real-time.

Carbon Footprint Monitor 
Carbon Footprint Monitor graphically depicts the buildings impact on the environment in real-time.

Building Recognition

State of New Jersey 
 New Jersey Governor Jon Corzine presented the New Jersey Clean Energy Market Innovator Award

Energy Star 
 EnergyStar certification with a previously unheard of perfect rating of 100.

References

Sources

External links 
 Federal Times article
 ASHRAE High Performing Buildings
 Noveda Technologies
 "Cutting the Electric Cord" article 
 "Embracing Renewable Energy" article
 NJ Board of Public Utilities

Branchburg, New Jersey
Sustainable buildings in the United States
Buildings and structures in Somerset County, New Jersey
Buildings and structures completed in 2006